Alex Gard (born Alexei Mikhailovich Kremkov, ; also tr. Kremkoff; June 17, 1898 – June 1, 1948) was a Russian American cartoonist. He was a regular cartoonist for newspapers, magazines and books, but is most well known for his celebrity caricatures at Sardi's restaurant in New York City.

Biography 

He was born Alexei Mikhailovich Kremkov in Kazan, Russian Empire. He graduated from the naval academy in Saint Petersburg.

During World War I, he served in the Russian Navy on a destroyer.

Kremkov left Russia after the Bolshevik Revolution. He traveled east through China and Japan before reaching Egypt and finally France, where his name was romanised as Alexis Michel Kremkoff. In Nice, he drew cartoons for the magazine "Sur La Riviera" and then moved to Paris, where he drew cartoons for Le Matin, Fantasio, Sourire and others.

In 1924, he immigrated to New York City, where he began contributing to The New Yorker. He was a long-time contributor to the Sunday drama section of The New York Herald Tribune. He painted theater sets as well, including Nikita Baliyev's Die Fledermaus.

In 1926, he was hired to create caricatures of Broadway and other celebrities for the celebrity wall at Sardi's Restaurant in New York City. Owner Vincent Sardi and Gard drew up a contract which stated Gard would produce caricatures in exchange for one meal per day at the restaurant.

He was naturalized as a U.S. citizen in 1940 (under the name Alexis Gard Kremkoff). During World War II, Gard served in the United States Navy as a specialist first class.

Gard continued to draw caricatures in exchange for meals until his death, ultimately creating more than 700 pictures. Today, the caricatures are housed in the Billy Rose Theatre Division of the New York Public Library for the Performing Arts.

Death

On June 1, 1948, Gard collapsed on Seventh Avenue and 41st Street. He died as he was being transported to Roosevelt Hospital.

A memorial service was held for Gard at the Russian Orthodox Christ the Saviour Church, followed by a funeral mass the next day. He was buried at Arlington National Cemetery.

Collection 
His collection includes about 700 drawings, which includes his caricatures of famous cultural figures, including actors and musicians Paul Ash, Edith Atwater,  Pearl Bailey, Eddie Cantor, Katharine Cornell, Ted Healy, Katharine Hepburn, Leslie Howard, Josephine Hull, Bert Lahr, and Ethel Merman; ballet dancers Irina Baronova, Richard Boleslavsky, Leon Danielian, David Lichine and Tatiana Riabouchinska; producer Winthrop Ames, and Met director Edward Robinson.

His collection is housed at the New York Public Library for the Performing Arts.

Published works 
 Broadway Portraits by Samuel Marx (New York: Donald Flamm, 1929)
 Ballet Laughs (New York: The Greystone Press, 1941)
 Sailors in Boots (New York: C. Scribner's Sons, 1943)
 Getting Salty (New York: Charles Scribner's Sons, 1944)
 Sick Bay (New York: C. Scribner's Sons, 1945)
 More Ballet Laughs (New York: C. Scribner's Sons, 1946)
 Stars Off Gard (New York: C. Scribner's Sons, 1947)

Collection 
His collection includes about 700 drawings, which includes his caricatures of famous cultural figures, including actors and musicians Paul Ash, Edith Atwater,  Pearl Bailey,
 List of caricatures at Sardi's restaurant

References

Further reading
 Vincent Sardi, Jr. with Thomas Edward West. Off the Wall at Sardi's (Applause Books, 1991) 
 Vincent Sardi, Sr. with Richard Gehman. Sardi's: The Story of a Famous Restaurant (Henry Holt and Co., 1953)

External links
  (name spelled as "Alexis Krenkoff" on gravestone)
 

1898 births
1948 deaths
Russian caricaturists
Russian editorial cartoonists
Russian cartoonists
New-York Tribune personnel
Artists from Kazan
White Russian emigrants to France
Emigrants from the Russian Empire to France
Imperial Russian Navy personnel
United States Navy personnel of World War II
White Russian emigrants to the United States
Burials at Arlington National Cemetery
United States Navy sailors